Karauli–Dholpur Lok Sabha constituency is one of the 25 Lok Sabha (parliamentary) constituencies in Rajasthan state in western India. This constituency came into existence in 2008 as a part of the implementation of delimitation of parliamentary constituencies.

Assembly segments
Presently, Karauli–Dholpur Lok Sabha comprises eight Vidhan Sabha (legislative assembly) segments. These are:

Dholpur assembly segment was earlier in erstwhile Bayana constituency. Karauli assembly segment was in erstwhile Sawai Madhopur constituency.

Members of Parliament
 Until 2008 : Seat did not exist.
2009: Khiladi Lal Bairwa, Indian National Congress
2014: Manoj Rajoria, Bharatiya Janata Party
2019: Manoj Rajoria, Bharatiya Janata Party

Election results

2019

2014

2009

See also
 Bayana (Lok Sabha constituency)
 Sawai Madhopur (Lok Sabha constituency)
 Karauli district
 Dholpur district 
 List of Constituencies of the Lok Sabha

Notes

External links
Karauli-Dholpur lok sabha constituency election 2019 result details

Lok Sabha constituencies in Rajasthan
Karauli district
Dholpur district
Constituencies established in 2008